The Fujian Fanghua Yue Drama Troupe is a Chinese Yue opera troupe based in Fuzhou, Fujian. It was founded in 1946 by Yin Guifang in Shanghai as Shanghai Fanghua Yue Drama Troupe and relocated to Fujian in 1959.

References

1946 establishments in China
Yue opera troupes
Culture in Fujian